A room is an enclosed space in a building.

Room or rooms may also refer to:

Arts, entertainment and media 
 Room (2005 film), an independent drama film 
 Room (novel), by Emma Donoghue, 2010
 Room (2015 film), an independent drama film, based on the novel
 Room (2023 play), a Broadway play, based on the novel and the film
 Room - The Mystery, a 2014 Indian thriller film 
 Room (Katey Sagal album), 2004
 Room (Nels Cline and Julian Lage album), 2014
 "Rooms", a song by Inhale Exhale from the 2009 album Bury Me Alive
 Room (magazine), a Canadian quarterly literary journal
 The Room, a 2003 American drama film written, produced, executive produced and directed by Tommy Wiseau.
 The Room, a 2019 thriller film directed by Christian Volckman.

People 
 Abram Room (1894–1976), a Russian film director
 Adrian Room (1933–2011), a British toponymist and onomastician 
 Eloy Room (born 1989), a Dutch-Curaçaoan footballer
 Frederick George Room (1895–1932), an English recipient of Victoria Cross
 Henry Room (1802–1850), an English painter
 Thomas Gerald Room (1902–1986), an Australian mathematician

Other uses
 Room (Chinese constellation)
 Real-Time Object-Oriented Modeling, a domain specific language 
 Room for PlayStation Portable (ROOM), a social networking service
 Room, an obsolete unit of measurement for coal

See also
 
 
 The Room (disambiguation)
 Roome (disambiguation)
 Rheum
 Rum, Nepal
 Room number, a number assigned to a room within a building